Typhoo (sometimes stylized as Ty•Phoo) is a brand of tea in the United Kingdom.  It was launched in 1903 by John Sumner Jr. of Birmingham, England.

History

In 1863, William Sumner published A Popular Treatise on Tea as a by-product of the first trade missions to China from London. In 1870, William and his son John Sumner founded a pharmacy/grocery business in Birmingham. William's grandson, John Sumner Jr. (born in 1856), took over the running of the business in the 1900s.  Following comments from his sister on the calming effects of tea fannings, in 1903, John Jr. decided to create a new tea that he could sell in his shop.

Sumner set his own criteria for the new brand:
 The name had to be distinctive and unlike others.
 It had to be a name that would trip off the tongue.
 It had to be one that would be protected by registration.

The name Typhoo comes from the Mandarin Chinese word for "doctor".

Typhoo began making tea bags in 1967. In 1978, production was moved from Birmingham to Moreton on the Wirral Peninsula, in Merseyside. The Moreton site was also the location of Burton's Foods and Manor Bakeries factories.

Typhoo has been owned since July 2021 by British private-equity firm Zetland Capital. It was previously owned by Apeejay Surrendra Group of India.

Recent history

Ownership
In 1968, Typhoo merged with Schweppes. The following year this company in turn merged with Cadbury to form Cadbury Schweppes. In 1986, in an effort to focus on their core brands, Cadbury Schweppes sold Typhoo, along with Kenco coffee and Jeyes Fluid. Typhoo was subject to management buy out forming a new company, Premier Brands, which  acquired, in rapid succession, Melrose's, the Glengettie Tea Company, Ridgways (founded by Thomas Ridgway), and the Jersey Trading Corporation. In 1990, the company was itself acquired by Premier Foods, then trading as Hillsdown Holdings.

In October 2005, the Indian company Apeejay Surrendra Group purchased the brands for £80 million from Premier Foods and created The Typhoo Tea Company. The brand continued to be manufactured at Moreton on the Wirral.

Record high material costs and adverse currency movements saw Typhoo Tea's profits plummet to a £20m loss in the year ending 31 March 2018. The tea maker recognised the year as one of the most challenging trading periods for the business in recent history.

Early in 2020, Typhoo Tea proposed cutting about a quarter of posts at its headquarters to safeguard the future of the company. The restructuring, which is subject to the outcome of a consultation, would see 55 full-time and 21 temporary jobs closed at the firm's factory in Moreton, Wirral, a spokesman said.  He said the plan came against "the backdrop of an increasingly challenging trading environment".

In 2020 Typhoo Tea reported mounting losses in a "watershed" year for the business, raising doubts about the brand’s ability to continue trading. They reported pre-tax losses of £29.9m for the 12 months to March 2019, up from £20m the prior year. The accounts warned that an inability to refinance or extend its financing agreements "represents a material uncertainty which may cast significant doubt over the company’s ability to continue as a going concern". Furthermore, the accounts stated there remained a "high level of uncertainty" as to the impact of the coronavirus outbreak, despite reporting an upward trend in supermarket sales under lockdown. Typhoo blamed its poor performance on the decision to continue to pursue an "aggressive" sales growth strategy focused on boosting its own-label business.

In July 2021 Typhoo Tea Limited was acquired by private equity firm Zetland Capital.

Apeejay Typhoo Tea is the Indian arm of Typhoo, manufacturing and selling products in India.

In March 2023, Typhoo announced it was closing its Moreton factory and outsourcing production.

Sponsorships
In 2012, Typhoo became the main jersey sponsor for St. Helens Rugby league club which competes in the Super League.

Slogans 
The Typhoo brand is well known in Britain for its long-running television commercial campaign jingles, such as:

Putting 'T' back into Britain
There's only one 'T' in Typhoo
You only get an 'OO' with Typhoo
For the tea that picks you up, pick up Typhoo
Making good tea since 1903 
Typhoo Tea - two thumbs fresh
Great British tea since 1903

References

External links
 

Tea brands in the United Kingdom
Premier Foods brands
Products introduced in 1903